Nicaragua competed at the 1996 Summer Olympics in Atlanta, United States.

Athletics

Baseball

Men's Team Competition
Nicaragua's debut performance at the Olympic baseball tournament resulted in a semifinal run for the team.  They defeated Italy, Australia, South Korea, and the Netherlands in the preliminary round, losing to the three eventual medallists Cuba, Japan, and the United States.  This put the Nicaraguans in fourth place for the preliminary round, setting up a semifinal match against Cuba. This game resulted in extending Cuba's winning streak to 17 games, and relegating Nicaragua to the bronze medal game, which it lost to the United States.

Summary

Team Roster
Bayardo Davila
Martín Aleman 
Norman Cardozo 
Oswaldo Mairena 
Nemesio Porras 
José Luis Quiroz 
Carlos Alberto Berrios 
Sandy Moreno 
Omar Obando 
José Ramon Padilla 
Fredy Zamora 
Julio César Osejo 
Eduardo Bojorge 
Asdrudes Flores 
Anibal Vega 
Erasmo Baca 
Luis Daniel Miranda 
Fredy Corea 
Jorge Luis Avellan 
Henry Roa

Judo

Men's Half-Middleweight
Ricky Dixon

Men's Heavyweight
Arnulfo Betancourt

Shooting

Men's Air Rifle (10 metres)
Walter Martínez

Swimming 

Men's 200 Butterfly
 Walter Soza
 Heat — 2:04.66 (→ did not advance, 36th place)

Men's 200m Individual Medley
 Walter Soza
 Heat — 2:06.15 (→ did not advance, 20th place)

Men's 400m Individual Medley
 Walter Soza
 Heat — 4:32.11 (→ did not advance, 22nd place)

See also
Nicaragua at the 1995 Pan American Games

References

sports-reference

Nations at the 1996 Summer Olympics
Olympics
1996